Get Closer is the third studio album by Israeli alternative folk artist Geva Alon, released on 10 November 2009. The album was produced and mixed by Thom Monahan who has previously worked with the Pernice Brothers, Vetiver, Devendra Banhart and more.

Three singles were released from the album: "The Wind Whispers" on 1 October 2009, "I Can See the Stars" on 18 October 2009 and "Come Race Me" on 22 December 2009.

Track listing

Personnel
Geva Alon - lead vocals, guitar
Ben Golan - guitar, vocals
Dor Koren - bass
Naveh Koren - drums, percussion

2009 albums
Geva Alon albums
Albums produced by Thom Monahan